Marsha Norman (born September 21, 1947) is an American playwright, screenwriter, and novelist. She received the 1983 Pulitzer Prize for Drama for her play 'night, Mother. She wrote the book and lyrics for such Broadway musicals as The Secret Garden, for which she won a Tony Award and the Drama Desk Award for Outstanding Book of a Musical, and The Red Shoes, as well as the libretto for the musical The Color Purple and the book for the musical The Bridges of Madison County.  She is co-chair of the playwriting department at The Juilliard School.

Biography

Early years
Norman was born in Louisville, Kentucky, the oldest of four children of Billie and Bertha Williams. As a child, she read and played the piano. She later began attending productions by the newly founded Actors Theatre of Louisville. She received a bachelor's degree from Agnes Scott College and a master's degree from the University of Louisville. She worked as a journalist for The Louisville Times newspaper, and also wrote for Kentucky Educational Television. She taught young children and adolescents in mental institutions and hospitals. These were perhaps her biggest influence on her writing, especially a 13-year-old girl who influenced her play Getting Out. She also taught English at the J. Graham Brown School and Prestonia Elementary School in Louisville.

Career
Norman's first play Getting Out was produced at the Actors Theatre of Louisville and then Off-Broadway in 1979. The play concerns a young woman just paroled after an eight-year prison sentence for robbery, kidnapping and manslaughter. It reflects Norman's experience working with disturbed adolescents at Kentucky's Central State Hospital.

Norman's success with Getting Out led her to move to New York City where she continued to write for the Actors Theatre of Louisville. Her full-length play, Circus Valentine was produced at the Humana Festival in 1978. The play concerns a travelling circus and its star attraction, Siamese twins. Her next play, 'night, Mother, became her best-known work, given its Broadway success and its star-powered film version. The play brought Norman a great deal of recognition, dealing frankly with the subject of suicide, and won the 1983 Pulitzer Prize for Drama, the Susan Smith Blackburn Prize, the Hull-Warriner, the Drama Desk Award, and the 1986 Golden Plate Award of the American Academy of Achievement. However, her follow-up play, Traveller in the Dark received scathing reviews from the New York critics, some of whom were as blunt to say she could not have written it. According to an interview in The New York Times, "Ms. Norman stayed away from the theater and turned to screenplays, including a 1986 movie adaptation of 'night, Mother that starred Sissy Spacek and Anne Bancroft and failed to impress critics. She was in high demand in Hollywood, though not always for films that she liked, or that studios would approve."

Norman wrote the book and lyrics for the musical The Secret Garden, an adaptation of the  Frances Hodgson Burnett novel The Secret Garden, and won the Tony Award for Best Book in 1991. Her work in musical theatre continued with the book and lyrics for the musical The Red Shoes, which failed on Broadway in 1993. Her one-act play, Trudy Blue, was produced off-Broadway in 1999. That play revolved around a woman who is mistakenly told that she has two months to live. She also wrote the libretto for the musical version of The Color Purple which opened on Broadway in 2005, receiving a Tony Award nomination for Best Book of a Musical.

Norman and composer Jason Robert Brown made a symphonic adaptation of the children's novel The Trumpet of the Swan, which premiered at the Kennedy Center in 2008. Norman has since written the libretto for the musical adaptation of the film The Bridges of Madison County, with a score by Brown. The musical premiered at the Williamstown Theatre Festival on August 1, 2013 and ran briefly on Broadway from February 20, 2014.

Television and film

Norman's scripts for television and film include the film version of 'night, Mother. She has written the television films Face of a Stranger (1991), A Cooler Climate (1999), Custody of the Heart (2000), and The Audrey Hepburn Story (2000). She has written screenplays for episodes of the HBO series In Treatment.

Other

Norman has served on the faculty of the Juilliard School in New York City as Co-Director of Juilliard's Lila Acheson Wallace American Playwrights Program, and is Vice-President of the Dramatists Guild of America. She was honored at the 2011 William Inge Festival for Distinguished Achievement in the American Theatre. She will leave Juilliard at the end of the 2019–2020 academic year.

Bibliography
Note: plays or musicals unless otherwise indicated

Getting Out (1977)
Circus Valentine (1979)
'night, Mother (1983)
Traveller in the Dark (1984)
The Fortune Teller (1987) (novel)
Third and Oak
The Laundromat
The Poolhall
The Holdup
Sarah and Abraham
Loving Daniel Boone
Lunch With Ginger, one-act play
The Secret Garden (1991), musical stage adaptation of the novel by Frances Hodgson Burnett. Collaboration with Lucy Simon.
The Red Shoes (1993)
Trudy Blue (play written around Lunch With Ginger) (1999)
The Color Purple (2005), musical stage adaptation of the Alice Walker novel. Collaboration with Brenda Russell, Allee Willis, and Stephen Bray.
The Master Butchers Singing Club (2010)
The Trumpet of the Swan (2011), musical stage adaptation of the book by E. B. White. Collaboration with Jason Robert Brown.
The Bridges of Madison County (2014), musical stage adaptation of the novel by Robert James Waller. Collaboration with Jason Robert Brown.

References

External links

Marsha Norman papers, circa 1947-2011, Houghton Library, Harvard University

Marsha Norman Downstage Center XM radio interview at American Theatre Wing.org, October 2006

1947 births
20th-century American dramatists and playwrights
20th-century American women writers
21st-century American dramatists and playwrights
21st-century American women writers
Agnes Scott College alumni
American women dramatists and playwrights
American women screenwriters
Broadway composers and lyricists
Educators from New York City
American women educators
Juilliard School faculty
Kentucky women musicians
Kentucky women writers
Living people
Pulitzer Prize for Drama winners
Screenwriters from Kentucky
Screenwriters from New York (state)
Tony Award winners
University of Louisville alumni
Women music educators
Writers from Louisville, Kentucky